The following is a list of county-maintained roads in Roseau County, Minnesota, United States. Some of the routes included in this list are also county-state-aid-highways (CSAH.)

Route list

External links
Roseau County Map

Roseau
Roseau